The Lake Zumbro Hydroelectric Generating Plant, also known as the City of Rochester Municipal Hydro-Electric Plant, is a hydroelectric facility on the Zumbro River in Mazeppa and Zumbro Townships in the U. S. State of Minnesota. The facility consists of a gravity dam and a powerhouse, and formerly included three houses for the plant operators. The houses were removed in the 1960s when the dam was retrofitted to allow remote operation of the generating equipment from Rochester. The impoundment created is called Lake Zumbro.

The idea of building a hydroelectric plant on the Zumbro River north of Rochester had been discussed at least as far back as 1904, when several entrepreneurs surveyed the river, going so far as to buy land for a dam site. An effort was made to secure funding for a  dam and transmission line to enable sale of electricity to the city, but the city council declined the arrangement as they did not feel that Rochester's power consumption would justify it. In 1915, a bond issue for a new hydroelectric plant was put before the city council, possibly spurred by the recent loss of the coal-fired municipal power plant in a fire. Voters overwhelmingly approved a $360,000 bond issue in a special election held in January, 1916.  

The facility was designed by pioneering hydroelectric engineer Hugh Lincoln Cooper (1865–1937), a Minnesota native with strong ties to the city of Rochester, and was built from 1917 to 1919.  It is still operated by its original owner, Rochester Public Utilities (RPU), to supply power to Rochester, Minnesota,  to the south.  The Lake Zumbro Hydroelectric Generating Plant was listed on the National Register of Historic Places in 1991 for its state-level significance in the theme of engineering.  It was nominated as a representative work of Cooper—one of the nation's leading hydroelectric engineers in the early 20th century—and his only project in his home state of Minnesota.

On the night of August 24, 2019, a pontoon boat with three people on board went over the dam.  They were casting off from the lake shore after patronizing a business below the dam but got caught on the lip of the spillway.  A fourth person jumped off and swam to a buoy, where she yelled for help, while the other three went over the edge in the boat.  It lodged right-side-up near the base of the dam, causing the people on board only minor injuries.  Firefighters, sheriff's deputies, and civilian boaters rescued all four individuals.  The Wabasha County Sheriff's Office ascribed the incident to alcohol and darkness, charging the driver with boating while intoxicated.

See also

 List of dams and reservoirs in Minnesota
 National Register of Historic Places listings in Wabasha County, Minnesota

References

External links
 Power Facilities–Rochester Public Utilities

1919 establishments in Minnesota
Buildings and structures in Wabasha County, Minnesota
Dams completed in 1919
Dams on the National Register of Historic Places in Minnesota
Energy infrastructure completed in 1919
Energy infrastructure on the National Register of Historic Places
Hydroelectric power plants in Minnesota
Industrial buildings and structures on the National Register of Historic Places in Minnesota
National Register of Historic Places in Wabasha County, Minnesota
Neoclassical architecture in Minnesota
United States local public utility dams
Zumbro River